Kyle Bratrud (born 9 February 1993) is an American cross-country skier born in Eden Prairie, Minnesota.

He competed at the 2013 World Junior Championships. He made his World Cup debut in February 2015 in Östersund. He collected his first World Cup points in February 2019 in Cogne, finishing 26th in the 15 km race.

He represented the US at the 2015, 2017 and 2019 World Championships. His best placement in an individual event is a 31st place, however in the relay the US team improved steadily from an 11th place in 2015 to a 10th place in 2017 and ninth place in 2019.

Cross-country skiing results
All results are sourced from the International Ski Federation (FIS).

World Championships

World Cup

Season standings

References

1993 births
Living people
American male cross-country skiers